Philip H. Neal (born in Richmond, Virginia) was a principal dancer with New York City Ballet.

Career
He studied from age 11 at the Richmond Ballet School. After studying there, Edward Villella arranged a summer scholarship for him at NCYB's School of American Ballet. In 1985 Philip won the silver medal at the Prix de Lausanne ballet competition.

The following year Neal graduated magna cum laude from St. Paul's School and was a National Foundation for Advancement in the Arts' Presidential Scholar of the Arts and as a consequence performed at Kennedy Center in Washington, D.C. He subsequently enrolled full-time at SAB and also trained at the Royal Danish Ballet School in Copenhagen, joining NYCB's corps de ballet in 1987. 

Four years later Neal was promoted to soloist and at the end of the 1992–1993 winter season to principal dancer. Neal's farewell performance took place Sunday, June 13, 2010, and consisted of ballets by George Balanchine.

Originated rôles

Peter Martins 

 Guide to Strange Places
 Todo Buenos Aires

Kevin O'Day 

 Swerve Poems

Featured rôles

George Balanchine 
 Allegro Brillante
 Ballade
 Chaconne
 Cortège Hongrois
 The Nutcracker
 Divertimento No. 15
 Jewels Diamonds
 A Midsummer Night's Dream
 Mozartiana
 Robert Schumann’s Davidsbündlertänze
 Serenade
 Slaughter on Tenth Avenue
 Swan Lake
 Tschaikovsky Pas de Deux
 Tschaikovsky Piano Concerto No. 2
 Western Symphony
 Who Cares?

Ulysses Dove 
 Red Angels

Boris Eifman 
 Musagète

Peter Martins 
 Black And White
 Ecstatic Orange
 Fearful Symmetries
 Les Gentilhommes
 The Sleeping Beauty Prince Désiré
 Songs of the Auvergne
 Swan Lake Prince Siegfried
 The Waltz Project

Jerome Robbins 
 Brandenburg
 Dances at a Gathering
 The Four Seasons Spring
 Glass Pieces
 The Goldberg Variations
 I'm Old Fashioned
 In G Major
 Interplay

Richard Tanner 
 Ancient Airs and Dances

Television 

 PBS Live from Lincoln Center, New York City Ballet's Diamond Project: Ten Years of New Choreography, 2002, Ancient Airs and Dances
 PBS Live from Lincoln Center, Lincoln Center Celebrates Balanchine 100, 2004, Liebeslieder Walzer

Footnotes

New York Times 

New York City Ballet principal dancers
Prix de Lausanne winners
American male ballet dancers
Living people
Year of birth missing (living people)
School of American Ballet alumni
School of American Ballet faculty
Balanchine Trust repetiteurs